The 1942 La Flèche Wallonne was the sixth edition of La Flèche Wallonne cycle race and was held on 19 July 1942. The race started in Mons and finished in Marcinelle. The race was won by Karel Thijs.

General classification

References

1942 in road cycling
1942
1942 in Belgian sport